Adeola Aboyade-Cole (20 March 1950 – 17 March 1989) was a Nigerian hurdler. He competed in the men's 110 metres hurdles at the 1972 Summer Olympics.

References

External links

1950 births
1989 deaths
Athletes (track and field) at the 1970 British Commonwealth Games
Athletes (track and field) at the 1972 Summer Olympics
Athletes (track and field) at the 1974 British Commonwealth Games
Nigerian male hurdlers
Olympic athletes of Nigeria
Place of birth missing
African Games medalists in athletics (track and field)
African Games silver medalists for Nigeria
Athletes (track and field) at the 1973 All-Africa Games
Commonwealth Games competitors for Nigeria
20th-century Nigerian people